Tonto National Monument Archeological District is a historic district containing archeological sites within Tonto National Monument in Arizona.

It was listed on the National Register of Historic Places in 1966.

References

External links
 NPS−National Park Service: ”Tonto National Monument: Saving a National Treasure” – a National Park Service Teaching with Historic Places (TwHP) lesson plan.
 NPS: American Southwest, a National Park Service Discover Our Shared Heritage Travel Itinerary

Geography of Gila County, Arizona
Historic districts on the National Register of Historic Places in Arizona
Archaeological sites on the National Register of Historic Places in Arizona
National Register of Historic Places in Gila County, Arizona